Duke of Wellington is a title in the Peerage of the United Kingdom. The name derived from Wellington in Somerset. The title was created in 1814 for Arthur Wellesley, 1st Marquess of Wellington (1769–1852; born as The Hon. Arthur Wesley), the Anglo-Irish military commander who is best known for leading the decisive victory with Field Marshal von Blücher over Napoleon's forces at Waterloo in Brabant (now Walloon Brabant, Belgium). Wellesley later served twice as British prime minister.

The first Duke's father, Garret Wesley, had been granted the title of Earl of Mornington in 1760. His male-line ancestors were wealthy agricultural and urban landowners in both countries, among the Anglo-Irish Protestant Ascendancy. The dukedom has descended to heirs male of the body, along with eleven other hereditary titles.

History
The titles of Duke of Wellington and Marquess Douro were bestowed upon Arthur Wellesley, 1st Marquess of Wellington, on 3 May 1814 after he returned home a hero following Napoleon's abdication. He fought some sixty battles during his military career. He was considered "the conqueror of Napoleon". He stands as one of the finest soldiers that Great Britain and Ireland has ever produced, others being the 1st Duke of Marlborough and the 2nd Duke of Argyll.

Following his victory at the Battle of Talavera, Wellesley was offered a peerage. The question was what title should he take. His brother, Richard Wellesley, Earl of Mornington, looked around and discovered that a manor in the parish of Wellington was available. It was also reasonably close to the family name. Because Arthur was still in Spain in command of the army fighting the French, Richard oversaw the purchase. By this process Arthur therefore became Marquess of Wellington. According to the book Wellington as Military Commander by Michael Glover, Arthur Wellesley first signed himself 'Wellington' on 16 September 1809. At the Battle of Waterloo in 1815, Arthur Wellesley was already further elevated to the peerage rank of the Duke of Wellington. At the time he became Ambassador to France, The London Gazette of 4 June 1814 refers to him as having that title but suggests that it was granted by warrant on 25 August 1812.

The subsidiary titles of the Duke of Wellington are Marquess of Wellington (1812), Marquess Douro (1814), Earl of Mornington (1760 – but only inherited by the Dukes of Wellington in 1863), Earl of Wellington (1812), Viscount Wellesley (1760 – inherited in 1863), Viscount Wellington (1809), Baron Mornington (1746 – also inherited in 1863), and Baron Douro (1809). The Viscountcy of Wellesley and the Barony and Earldom of Mornington are in the Peerage of Ireland; the rest are in the Peerage of the United Kingdom.

Apart from the British titles, the Dukes of Wellington also hold the titles of Prince of Waterloo (Prins van Waterloo, 1815) of the Kingdom of the Netherlands, Duke of Ciudad Rodrigo (Duque de Ciudad Rodrigo, 1812) of the Kingdom of Spain, and Duke of Victoria (Duque da Vitória, 1812), with the subsidiary titles Marquess of Torres Vedras (Marquês de Torres Vedras, 1812) and Count of Vimeiro (Conde de Vimeiro, 1811) of the Kingdom of Portugal. These were granted to the first Duke as victory titles for his distinguished service as victorious commanding general in the Peninsular War (in Spain and Portugal) and at the Battle of Waterloo (in what is now Belgium).

The family seat is Stratfield Saye House, near Basingstoke, Hampshire. Apsley House, in London, is now owned by English Heritage, although the family retain an apartment there.

Five Dukes have been created Knights of the Garter, the most senior British order of knighthood.

Dukes of Wellington (1814)

Title succession

Line of succession

 Arthur Wellesley, 4th Duke of Wellington (1849–1934)
 Gerald Wellesley, 7th Duke of Wellington (1885–1972)
 Valerian Wellesley, 8th Duke of Wellington (1915–2014)
 Charles Wellesley, 9th Duke of Wellington (b. 1945)
(1) Arthur Wellesley, Earl of Mornington (b. 1978)
(2) Arthur Wellesley, Viscount Wellesley (b. 2010)
(3) Hon. Alfred Wellesley (b. 2014)
(4) Lord Frederick Wellesley (b. 1992)
(5) Lord Richard Wellesley (b. 1949)
(6) Lord John Wellesley (b. 1954)
(7) Gerald Wellesley (b. 1981)
(8) Lord James Wellesley (b. 1956) 
(9) Oliver Wellesley (b. 2005)
Lord George Wellesley (1889–1967)
Richard Wellesley (1920–1984)
John Wellesley (1962–2009)
(10) Thomas Wellesley (b. 2000)''

Should the direct male line of succession from the first Duke of Wellington become extinct, the dukedom and its subsidiary titles in the British peerage will become extinct, as will the titles of Prince of Waterloo in the Dutch peerage and the dukedom of the Victory and its subsidiary titles in the Portuguese peerage. The dukedom of Ciudad Rodrigo in the Spanish peerage, together with its subsidiary titles, will continue to be held in the female line of descendants of the first Duke. The earldom and barony of Mornington, along with the viscountcy of Wellesley, which are all titles in the Irish peerage, will revert to the line of the Earl Cowley, a male-line descendant of a younger brother of the first Duke of Wellington.

The Colley or Cowley family had come to Ireland from Glaston, in Rutland about 1500; Sir Henry Colley was elevated to the Peerage as Lord Glaston by Henry VIII.  He  married the daughter of Thomas Cusack, Lord Chancellor of Ireland, Catherine Wellesley Cusack (d. 1598) whose  grandmother was a Wellesley. Upon the death of his cousin Garret Wesley and his inheritance of the Estates of Dangan and Mornington, Richard Colley (d. 1758) and his wife Elizabeth Sale (d. 17 June 1738) daughter of John Sale, Registrar of the Diocese of Dublin, on 23 December 1719. adopted the name Wellesley (from both Elizabeth's maternal family side from Catherine Wellesley Cusack her grandmother) and through her Husband's Family, his cousin, Garret Wesley (Wellesley).

See also
Duke of Ciudad Rodrigo
Prins van Waterloo
Duque da Vitória
 Waterloo ceremony

References

Works cited

External links
 Duke of Wellington's Regiment
 Genealogical information on the Dukes of Vitória
 Genealogical information on the Marquesses of Torres Vedras
 Genealogical information on the Counts of Vimeiro

Dukedoms in the Peerage of the United Kingdom

1814 establishments in the United Kingdom
Noble titles created in 1814
Noble titles created for UK MPs
British landowners